The 2011 UK Open Qualifier 1 was the first of eight 2011 UK Open Darts Qualifiers which was held at the Metrodome in Barnsley on Saturday 26 February.

Prize money

Draw

References

1